The House of Dzieduszycki (plural: Dzieduszyccy, feminine form: Dzieduszycka) is a Polish noble family first recorded in 1400.

History 

The family originated from Dzieduszyce near Żydaczów in present-day Lviv Oblast, western Ukraine.

Notable members
 Anastazja Dzieduszycka – (1842–1890), columnist
 Paulina Dzieduszycka – (1831–1892), writer
 Talia Dzieduszycka – (1811–1855), poet
 Aleksander Stanisław Dzieduszycki – (1813–1879), politician in Galicia
 Antoni Bazyli Dzieduszycki – (1757–1817), politician
 Franciszek Jan Dzieduszycki – (died 1714), Voivode of Podole
 Henryk Dzieduszycki – (1795–1845), landowner, industrialist
 Izydor Dzieduszycki – (1842–1888), historical and political writer
 Jerzy Dzieduszycki – (1575–1641), castellan of Lubaczów
 Jerzy Stanisław Dzieduszycki – (1670–1730), Great Crown Koniuszy
 Józef Kalasanty Dzieduszycki- (1772–1847), founder of the Poturzycki Library
 Juliusz Dzieduszycki – (1817–1885), landowner
 Juliusz Dzieduszycki – (1882–1942), politician and diplomate
 Karol Dzieduszycki – (1847–1902), landowner, politician in Galicia
 Kazimierz Adam Dzieduszycki – (1812–1885), deputy of the Sejm Krajowy
 Konstanty Dzieduszycki – (1884–1964), deputy of the Sejm and senator in the Second Republic of Poland
 Maurycy Dzieduszycki – (1813–1877), historian, journalist
 Mieczysław Antoni Dzieduszycki – (1823–1872), social activist
 Mikołaj Adam Dzieduszycki – (1769–1795), publicist
 Tadeusz Dzieduszycki – (1724–1777), Great Cześnik of the Crown
 Tadeusz Dzieduszycki – (1841–1918) deputy of the Sejm of the Land
 Tytus Dzieduszycki – (1796–1870) politician in Galicia
 Walerian Dzieduszycki – (1754–1832), patriotic activist, landowner
 Władysław Dzieduszycki – (1821–1868), deputy of the Sejm, horse breeder
 Włodzimierz Dzieduszycki – (1825–1899), naturalist
 Włodzimierz Dzieduszycki – (1885–1971), last Ordynat of the Poturzyce Fee Tail
 Wojciech Dzieduszycki – (1848–1909), politician, philosopher, essayist
 Wojciech Dzieduszycki – (1912–2008), artist
 Piotr Dzieduszycki – (born 1946), sociologist and journalist, social activist

Coat of arms 
The family coat of arms was Sas.

Residences

References